Stamford Welland Academy (formerly Stamford Queen Eleanor School) is a coeducational secondary school with academy status, located in Stamford in the English county of Lincolnshire.

History
Stamford Queen Eleanor School was formed in the late 1980s after the dissolution of the town's two comprehensive schools - Fane and Exeter. Previously a community school administered by Lincolnshire County Council, Stamford Queen Eleanor School converted to academy status on 1 November 2011 but continues to coordinate with Lincolnshire County Council for admissions. In 2014 the school became a sponsored academy under the Cambridge Meridian Academies Trust and was renamed Stamford Welland Academy. In 2017 Ofsted rated the school as “good” in all areas.

Academics
Stamford Welland Academy offers GCSEs, BTECs and OCR Nationals as programmes of study for pupils.

In the news
Overnight vandalism at the school on 18 May 2019 wrecked thousands of hours of craft work by model railway enthusiasts before the
Market Deeping Model Railway Club's annual show could take place.  Four youths were apprehended inside by police and later admitted criminal damage.

References

External links
Stamford Welland Academy official website

Secondary schools in Lincolnshire
Buildings and structures in Stamford, Lincolnshire
Education in Stamford, Lincolnshire
Academies in Lincolnshire